Joseph Wilbur (born 15 August 2001) is a panamanian rower. He participated in the 2019 U23 World Championships and 2019 Junior World Championships. He competed at the 2021 Olympic Qualification Regatta in Rio de Janeiro, Brazil. He earned a bronze medal at the 2021 South American Championships.

References 

2001 births
Living people